Stenoglene opalina is a moth in the family Eupterotidae. It was described by Druce in 1910. It is found in Cameroon and the Democratic Republic of Congo.

Description
The wingspan is about 54 mm. The forewings are yellowish vitreous strongly opalescent with numerous indistinct crenulate and sinuate transverse darker markings, these latter being almost absent in the basal three-fifths of the wings.

References

Moths described in 1910
Janinae